Ace of aces is a title accorded to the top active ace within a branch of service in a nation's military in time of war. The title is most closely associated with fighter aces, though there are other types, such as tank aces and submarine aces.

Flying aces

Ace of aces is a title accorded to the top flying ace of a nation's air force during time of war.

World War I

The concept of aces emerged in 1915 during World War I.

World War II

World War II had more planes than any other war.

Post-World War II era

Submarine aces

 
Ace of the Deep is a title accorded to the top subsea ace/undersea ace/submarine ace of a nation's submarine force during time of war.

Submarine hunters

Tank aces 

A "tank ace" or Panzer ace has been described by Historian Robert Kershaw, as being the minority of tank commanders that accounted for the most destroyed enemy armor, saying it is roughly analogous with a flying ace.

See also
Ace (military)

References

Citations

General and cited references

World War I sources

Later wars 
 Aces of WWII
 .
 Toliver, Raymond F. and Trevor J. Constable (1998). Die deutschen Jagdflieger-Asse 1939 – 1945. Stuttgart, Germany: Motorbuch Verlag. .
 Samuel, Wolfgang W.E. (2004). American Raiders — The Race to Capture the Luftwaffe's Secrets. University Press of Mississippi. .

Aces
Lists of military personnel